Cheng Fung is a Macanese professional football club which currently competes in the Liga de Elite.

2019 season
The club won its first top tier trophy, the Taça de Macau in 2019 after beating defending champions Chao Pak Kei on penalties in the final.

Current squad
Squad for the 2019 Liga de Elite

Honours

Cup Competitions
Taça de Macau
 Champions (1): 2019
 Runners-up (2): 2018, 2021

References 

Football clubs in Macau